Roberto Gravina (born 8 July 1977 in Rome) is an Italian politician.

He ran for Mayor of Campobasso with the Five Star Movement at the 2019 local elections and he was elected at the second round on 9 June. He took office on 11 June 2019.

See also
2019 Italian local elections
List of mayors of Campobasso

References

External links
 
 

1977 births
Living people
Mayors of Campobasso
Five Star Movement politicians